Sir Stephen Harry Waley-Cohen, 2nd Baronet (born 22 June 1946 in Westminster, London) is an English theatre owner-manager and producer, following a career as a businessman and financial journalist.  He manages the St. Martin's Theatre in London's West End and is the current producer of the world's longest running play The Mousetrap. He was Chairman of the Royal Academy of Dramatic Art (RADA) Council.

Career

Business
Waley-Cohen was a financial journalist, at the Daily Mail from 1968–73, and a founder director and publisher at Euromoney Publications (which later became Euromoney Institutional Investor PLC) from 1969–83.

He was involved with the insurance business, including as chairman of Willis Faber & Dumas (Agencies) (part of what became the Willis Group) from 1992–99, director of the Stewart Wrightson Members Agency Ltd 1987–98 and chairman of Policy Portfolio plc from 1993–98.

He was chairman of First Call Group plc from 1996–98 and of Portsmouth & Sunderland Newspaper plc from 1998–99. He was a director of Exeter Preferred Capital Investment Trust plc 1992–2003.

Theatre
Waley-Cohen has been a theatre owner and manager since 1984 when he was Joint Chief Executive of Maybox Group, which managed the Albery (now named the Noël Coward), Criterion, Donmar Warehouse, Piccadilly, Whitehall (now Trafalgar Studios) and Wyndham's theatres, until it was sold in 1989.

In 1989 he became managing director of the Victoria Palace Theatre, and took on the management of the St. Martin's Theatre. He managed the Vaudeville Theatre from 1996–2001 and the Savoy from 1997–2005. In April 2007 he took over the Ambassadors Theatre. In 2014, he sold the Victoria Palace to Delfont Mackintosh Theatres.

He became the producer of The Mousetrap in 1994. During his time managing the St. Martin's Theatre, he had got to know The Mousetrap's producer, Peter Saunders. Waley-Cohen said, "When [Saunders] wanted to retire at the age of 80, he picked up the phone to me". Mousetrap Productions, of which Waley-Cohen is the sole director, is licensed to produce the play by Mathew Prichard, Agatha Christie's grandson, to whom she gave the rights to The Mousetrap when he was nine.

In 1997, Waley-Cohen launched the education charity, Mousetrap Theatre Projects. The charity brings disadvantaged young people into the West End to experience theatre, and runs access, education and audience development programmes. The charity had taken over 100,000 young people to the theatre by 2012.

Politics
Waley-Cohen stood unsuccessfully as the Conservative candidate in both the General Elections in 1974 for the Manchester Gorton constituency.

Appointments and honours
Waley-Cohen was Chairman of the RADA Council until 2021 (a position to which he was elected in September 2007), and Chairman of RADA's Development Board. He was President of the Society of London Theatre from 2002–2005, having been a member since 1984 and a board member since 1993. He was a Trustee of The Theatres Trust from 1998–2004.

He is President of the JCA Charitable Foundation, which supports projects for education, agriculture and tourism in rural areas of Israel such as Galilee and the Negev. In 2011 he was awarded an honorary doctorate by the Ben-Gurion University of the Negev.

He was chairman of the British-American Project executive committee from 1989–92, and continued to have a role in its subsequent development.

As a hereditary baronet, Waley-Cohen is styled Sir as part of his baronetcy – the title is not a knighthood.

Personal life
Waley-Cohen has three children by his first marriage, to Pamela Doniger, and two with the American sculptor Josie Spencer, including the violinist Tamsin Waley-Cohen, composer Freya Waley-Cohen and the businessman Jack Waley-Cohen. His nephew is the successful amateur jockey Sam Waley-Cohen. His father, Bernard Waley-Cohen, was Lord Mayor of London, and his mother was educationalist and public servant Joyce Waley-Cohen.

Arms

References

1946 births
People educated at Eton College
Alumni of Magdalene College, Cambridge
English theatre managers and producers
English businesspeople
English Jews
Daily Mail journalists
Baronets in the Baronetage of the United Kingdom
People associated with RADA
Living people
Waley-Cohen family